Big Brother Thailand 1 was the first season of the Thailand reality television series Big Brother Thailand and aired on iTV's primetime block. The season started on 6 April 2005 and ended on 16 July 2005, lasting 106 days. It was the most talk-about season of Big Brother Thailand.

Housemates
Twelve housemates entered the house together on the first night. Each week, except for the first week, one of them would be evicted by the public vote. Due to Yinmy's ejection from the house on Week 11, Pim returned to the house to replace her. On the final night, the public voted for the housemate(s) they wanted to win, and Nipon Perktim (Tui) was the winner.

Aom-Am (อ๋อมแอ๋ม)
 Montriya Wichainsan is a 27 years old student from Nakhon Pathom She is the first housemate of the season to be evicted, on Day 15 with 3.77% to save.

Heaw (แห้ว)
Sophon Srisaku was the runner-up, losing to Tui in 53.75% to win.

Muay (หมวย)
Ratfah Deangpiboolsakul is the tenth housemate of the season to be evicted, on Day 99 with 49.03% to save.

Nara (นาร่า)
Pimchanok Nara Du be is a 33 years old manager from Bangkok. She is the second housemate of the season to be evicted, on Day 29 with 21.98% to save.

Num (หนุ่ม)
Udorn Phetsihng is from Samut Prakan.He is the eighth housemate of the season to be evicted, on Day 85 with 43.56% to save.

Peaky (เป็กกี้)
Warissara Buskeaw is 26 years old from Surin. She is a shopkeeper and insurance salesman. She is the second housemate of the season to be evicted, on Day 29 with 21.98% to save.

Pim (พิม)
Pimjak Chiwarak is a 23 years old student from Lampang. She is the fourth housemate of the season to be evicted, on Day 57 with 23.36% to save. But she returned on Day 75. Pim was the third place, losing to Yui & Heaw with 12.27% to win.

Pom (ป้อม)
Chatchai Photipana is a 25 years old Chef from Phrae. He is the seventh housemate of the season to be evicted, on Day 78 with 38.38% to save.

Por (ป๋อ)
Pramook Jareeprasit is the ninth housemate of the season to be evicted, on Day 92 with 10.13% to save.

Toto (โตโต้)
Puwadol Jinsiri is a 23-year-old Hairdryer from Phuket. He is the third housemate of the season to be evicted, on Day 43 with 27.54%.

Tui (ตุ้ย)
Nipon Perktim is the winner of the first season of Big Brother Thailand with 70.74% to win.

Yinmy (หยินมี่)
Napatnaphet Thitiwongsaroj is a 24 years old student from Pathum Thani. She is the first housemate of the season to be ejected from the show for rule-breaking, on day 65.

Nominations table

Notes
  Automatic nomination by Big Brother (due to violation(s) rule, reserved housemate evictions)
: Peaky and Por were nominated by Big Brother for discussing nominations.
: Yinmy was also nominated, however, she was kicked off from the show for rule-breaking before the eviction.

External links
Big Brother Thailand official website
Webboard Big Brother Thailand official website
Big Brother Thailand Fanclub official website

2005 Thai television seasons